The High Steward of Sutton Coldfield was an office relating to the government of the town of Sutton Coldfield, Warwickshire, England.

History
Prior to the Royal Charter of 1528 Walter Devereux, Lord Ferrers of Chartley held the office of High Steward under the Crown. He also held office as Bailiff of the Manor, Keeper of the Rolls and Keeper of Coldfield Walk. The salaries for these posts, under a grant of 1525, were to be paid at the rate of £16 a year to him and his son Henry for life.

On the granting of the Charter the town was to be held by a Warden and Society (roughly equivalent to Mayor and Corporation) and the inhabitants of the town. The Charter granted the right to appoint a High Steward, although this right was not exercised until 1547. The High Stewards were appointed for life and were to be entitled to a Deputy to assist in the duty of holding courts. At least in the 16th century, the High Steward was expected to have a knowledge of English law; but the role soon became symbolic and the duties largely ceremonial, and latterly the work was done entirely by Deputies.

The High Stewards were all persons of standing and mostly members of aristocratic Warwickshire and Staffordshire families.

In 1974 the Corporation of Sutton Coldfield merged with that of Birmingham and the office of High Steward became extinct.

List of High Stewards

References

History of Warwickshire
Sutton Coldfield
Sutton Coldfield